A kylix or cylix is a type of drinking cup used in ancient Greece 

Kylix may also refer to:
 Kylix (gastropod), a genus of snails in the family Drilliidae
 Cylix (fish), a genus of pipefish
 Borland Kylix, a programming tool